Jenny Sarah Perret (born 23 December 1991) is a Swiss curler from Lyss. She and partner Martin Rios won the 2017 World Mixed Doubles Curling Championship. The pair also represented Switzerland at the 2018 Winter Olympics where they won a silver medal.

In addition to her success in the mixed doubles discipline, Perret also won a bronze medal at the 2014 European Mixed Curling Championship and was the Swiss women's team alternate at the 2018 Winter Olympics.

References

External links

1991 births
Living people
Swiss female curlers
World mixed doubles curling champions
Swiss curling champions
Curlers at the 2018 Winter Olympics
Olympic curlers of Switzerland
Medalists at the 2018 Winter Olympics
Olympic silver medalists for Switzerland
Olympic medalists in curling
People from Biel/Bienne District
People from Schaumburg, Illinois
American emigrants to Switzerland
Curlers at the 2022 Winter Olympics
Sportspeople from the canton of Bern
21st-century Swiss women